Goodness may refer to:

 Good
 Goodness!, a 1969 album by jazz saxophonist Houston Person
 Goodness and value theory
 Goodness (band)
 Goodness (Goodness album)
 Goodness (The Hotelier album)
 Goodness, Greek concept arete
 Goodness, lunar feature a.k.a. Lacus Bonitatis
 Summum bonum, the "highest good"
 Eric Laithwaite's Goodness factor, a measure of the effectiveness of an electromagnetic machine

See also 

 Form of the Good, Plato's macrocosmic view of goodness in living
 Good (disambiguation)
 Good and evil
 Goodes (disambiguation)
 Goode, surname
 Goods (disambiguation)
 Good (surname)
 List of people known as the Good

Virtue
Fruit of the Holy Spirit